Yotam Solomon (born March 28, 1987) is a Los Angeles-based, Israeli-born fashion designer.

Biography

Personal life
Solomon's grandparents migrated from Austria and Hungary to Israel after the Holocaust. A son of Israeli-born parents, Yotam grew up in Israel and attended art school through his teen years. A viola prodigy since he was young, Solomon moved to Los Angeles in 2003. He attended Beverly Hills High School and graduated from Santa Susana High School, where he received the National Orchestra Award in 2005. After Santa Susana High School, Yotam attended FIDM for Fashion Design and graduated with honors. After graduation, Solomon acquired a pattern-making position for a men's label. This job opportunity inspired him to start his own label, presenting his first Spring-Summer 2008 Ready to Wear and Footwear Collection during LA Fashion Week, October 2007. Since, Yotam has showcased successful collections in LA and New York fashion weeks.

As a supporter of the arts, Yotam explained his thoughts about the art world from a fashion perspective. In March 2010, Yotam had an interview with KiptonArt where he talked about how whatever artists are doing affects designers and whatever designers are doing affects artists, as designers and artists draw inspiration from one another.

Career
Yotam Solomon started his eponymous label in July 2007. In Fall 2010, Yotam Solomon launched a diffusion footwear line titled YOTAM SOLOMON II, which was announced by Women's Wear Daily.

During the first night of NY Fashion's Night Out 2009, Yotam Solomon was selected for a presentation hosted by Tribeca. Design Within Reach collaborated with Yotam and Preston Lee, from Bravo's Top Design to celebrate "fashion and interior design". In the same year he was named "L.A.'s Top Young Designer" by AOL's Stylelist.

Yotam Solomon presented his Fall 2010 collection, titled Native American Collection at a private event in the Hollywood Hills in March 2010.

In May 2010 Yotam became a spokesperson for LG Electronics, teaming up with Victoria Beckham and Eva Longoria, who represented two different phones. He was chosen by Beckham to create a capsule collection inspired by the LG Lotus Elite, and appeared with her in the commercial that aired on MTV.
In September 2010 Yotam created a collection inspired by the BP oil spill in the Gulf of Mexico in order to raise awareness and funds. Receiving accolades from the media and fashion industry, Yotam was said to be "cleaning it up" by Refinery29.

In March 2012 Yotam took part in BREATHE LA's Attire to Inspire fashion fundraiser at the L.A. Live Conga Room.

References

External links
 Official Site

American fashion designers
Israeli fashion designers
California people in fashion
Shoe designers
1987 births
Living people
Jewish fashion designers
High fashion brands
Luxury brands
Sustainability advocates
Israeli people of Austrian-Jewish descent
Israeli people of Hungarian-Jewish descent
American people of Israeli descent